G. indica may refer to:
 Garcinia indica, the kokum, a fruit tree species of culinary, pharmaceutical and industrial uses
 Gracula indica, the Southern Hill myna, a bird species

See also
 Indica (disambiguation)